Władysław Gruberski (27 March 1873 – 14 November 1933) was a Polish sculptor. His work was part of the sculpture event in the art competition at the 1928 Summer Olympics.

References

External links
 

1873 births
1933 deaths
20th-century Polish sculptors
Polish male sculptors
20th-century male artists
Olympic competitors in art competitions
People from Płock